List of West German films of 1953. This was the fourth full year of film production since the formal partition of Germany into East and West in 1949. Major production centres were gathered in Hamburg, Munich and West Berlin. A number of co-productions were made between West Germany and Austria.

A–Z

Bibliography 
 Davidson, John & Hake, Sabine. Framing the Fifties: Cinema in a Divided Germany. Berghahn Books, 2007.
Fehrenbach, Heide. Cinema in Democratizing Germany: Reconstructing National Identity After Hitler. University of North Carolina Press, 1995.

See also
 List of Austrian films of 1953
 List of East German films of 1953

External links 
filmportal.de listing for films made in 1953

West German
Lists of German films
film